The International Journal of Circumpolar Health is a peer-reviewed healthcare journal covering issues related to the health of indigenous peoples in Arctic and Antarctic environments. It is published by the International Association of Circumpolar Health Publishers. According to the Journal Citation Reports, the journal has a 2015 impact factor of 0.707.

Overview 
The journal was established in 1972 as the Nordic Council for Arctic Medical Research Report. It was renamed in 1984 as Arctic Medical Research, obtaining its current name in 1997, reflecting a broader scope. In 2012 the journal moved to an online only open access format in partnership with Co-Action Publishing. Articles are published ongoing as they are ready for publication, and supplemental issues and special clusters of articles are also published.

References

External links

Publications established in 1972
Healthcare journals
Arctic research
Indigenous health
English-language journals